Thliptoceras bisulciforme is a moth in the family Crambidae. It was described by Zhang in 2014. It is found in Guangxi, China.

The wingspan is about 28–30 mm. The wings are fuscous with deep fuscous markings.

Etymology
The species name refers to the anellus looking like two parallel, trough-shaped sclerites and is derived from Latin bi (meaning two) and sulciformis (meaning trough-shaped).

References

Moths described in 2014
Pyraustinae